Harold James Cleworth is an automotive artist.

Personal life
Cleworth was born in Leigh, Lancashire in the late 1930s, the son of a bus driver  he was born into a family of two brothers and two sisters. He studied at Manchester College of Art graduating in 1967 with a degree in graphic art. He first worked in London where he illustrated album covers for Decca Records. In 1972, Cleworth moved to San Francisco, and began his automobile painting career in earnest. AutoWeek dubbed him "the painter laureate of the car".

Work
His work was exhibited at the Petersen Automotive Museum in Los Angeles in 2006. He is a member of the Automotive Fine Arts Society.

References

External links

 Automotive-Art

American artists
Living people
People from Leigh, Greater Manchester
1930s births